Zhizhevo (old variants: Zhizhovo, Darzhilovo) is a village in Southwestern Bulgaria. It is located in the Satovcha Municipality, Blagoevgrad Province.

Geography 

The village of Zhizhevo is located in the Western Rhodope Mountains. It belongs to the Chech region.

History 

According to Vasil Kanchov, in 1900 Zhizhevo was populated by 503 Bulgarian Muslims, living in 60 houses.

Religions 

The population is Muslim.

Notable people 

 Kamen Hadzhiev - professional football player of Rodopa Smolyan, Wattenscheid 09, Schalke 04, Pirin Gotse Delchev and Minyor Pernik.

Notes 

Villages in Blagoevgrad Province
Chech